is a PlayStation 2 fighting game based on the Japanese anime and manga series, Fullmetal Alchemist. The video game was published by Bandai and it was released on July 22, 2004, in Japan.

The game's story involves a fighting tournament during a large festival that allows for any pair of fighters to participate. The participants are allowed to use weapons and alchemical skills. The game's main characters are Edward Elric, Alphonse Elric, and Roy Mustang. The fighting involves the two versus two style of game playing. Each team shares a "star" meter which decreases each time one member of the team dies. If all the stars disappear, the battle ends.

Fullmetal Alchemist: Dream Carnival graphics have cel-shaded textures for the character models.

Characters
 Edward Elric
 Alphonse Elric
 Winry Rockbell
 Lust
 Gluttony
 Scar
 Roy Mustang
 Riza Hawkeye
 Alex Louis Armstrong
 Maes Hughes

Secret characters
 Greed
 Wrath
 Izumi Curtis
 King Bradley

Non-playable characters
 Envy

External links
 Official Japanese website
 Fullmetal Alchemist: Dream Carnival at GameSpy
 Fullmetal Alchemist: Dream Carnival  at Metacritic

2004 video games
Dream Carnival
Japan-exclusive video games
Platform fighters
PlayStation 2 games
PlayStation 2-only games
Fighting games
Video games developed in Japan
Video games scored by Manabu Namiki
Video games scored by Masaharu Iwata
Video games with cel-shaded animation
RenderWare games
Multiplayer and single-player video games
Bandai Namco games
Eighting games